The gens Gargonia was a minor Roman family during first and second centuries BC.  Some of the gens were of equestrian rank, but none appear to have held any curule magistracies.

Members

 Quintus Gargonius, the former master of Aulus Gargonius.
 Aulus Gargonius Q. l., a freedman whose name appears in a list of foremen who built a wall and parapet for Ceres at Capua in 106 BC.
 Gaius Gargonius, triumvir monetalis in 86 BC.
 Gaius Gargonius, an eques of little education, but a clear and intelligent speaker, according to Cicero.
 Gaius Gargonius, ridiculed by Horace in the Satires.  Found as "Gorgonius" in some manuscripts.
 Gargonius, a rhetorician mentioned by Seneca the Elder.
 Gnaeus Gargonius Paullinus, buried along the Via Flaminia at Fulginium.

See also
 List of Roman gentes

References

Bibliography
 Marcus Tullius Cicero, Brutus.
 Quintus Horatius Flaccus (Horace), Satirae (Satires).
 Lucius Annaeus Seneca (Seneca the Elder), Controversiae and Susasoriae.
 Dictionary of Greek and Roman Biography and Mythology, William Smith, ed., Little, Brown and Company, Boston (1849).
 Corpus Inscriptionum Latinarum.

Roman gentes